Tung Mei is one of the 25 constituencies in the Wong Tai Sin District in Hong Kong.

The constituency returns one district councillor to the Wong Tai Sin District Council, with an election every four years. The seat is held by Sze Tak-loy of the Association for Democracy and People's Livelihood.

Tung Mei constituency is loosely based on northern part of the Tung Tau Estate, Mei Tung Estate and Kai Tak Garden with an estimated population of 15,304.

Councillors represented

Election results

2010s

2000s

1990s

References

Wong Tai Sin
Constituencies of Hong Kong
Constituencies of Wong Tai Sin District Council
1994 establishments in Hong Kong
Constituencies established in 1994